"Walking Shoes" is a song written by Paul Kennerley, and recorded by American country music artist Tanya Tucker.  It was released in March 1990 as the first single from the album Tennessee Woman.  The song reached #3 on the Billboard Hot Country Singles & Tracks chart.

Cover versions
The song was also recorded by Outlaw (Terry Pugh) on his 2012 album "Old Friends" ...

Chart performance

Year-end charts

References

1990 singles
Tanya Tucker songs
Songs written by Paul Kennerley
Capitol Records Nashville singles
1990 songs
Song recordings produced by Jerry Crutchfield